The Road to Calvary, also translated as Ordeal, is a trilogy of novels by Aleksey Nikolayevich Tolstoy, tracing the fate of the Russian intelligentsia on the eve of, during, and after the revolution of 1917. It consists of the novels Sisters (1918–1922; «Сёстры»), The Eighteenth Year (1927–1928; «Восемнадцатый год») and Gloomy Morning (1940–1941; «Хмурое утро»). The first part was written for the émigré  readers, while the rest was written as a work of Socialist realism.

Background

The first part, Sisters, was written from 1918 to 1920, during the author's emigration, while the rest he wrote after his return to Soviet Russia. The novel Sisters was published in the White émigré journals Gryadushchaya Rossiya and Sovremennye zapiski under the title Walking Through Torments. In 1941, after the start of the Great Patriotic War, Tolstoy reworked the 2 first parts and wrote the third one as works of socrealism.

Plot
In the first chapters of the epic, St. Petersburg is shown in the beginning of 1914. Sisters Dasha and Ekaterina (Katya) Bulaviny, originally from Samara, are carried away by the poet-decadent Bessonoff. Katya is married to Smokovnikov, a lawyer, and has an illicit affair behind his back.

Over time, Ekaterina Dmitrievna falls in love with officer Vadim Petrovich Roshchin, and Dasha with Ivan Ilyich Telegin, an engineer at the Baltic plant. World War I, two revolutions and civil war carry the four main characters to different corners of the country. Their paths intersect more than once and again diverge. Roshchin joins the Volunteer Army, and Telegin joins the Red Army. At the end of the war, all four meet in the capital of Soviet Russia, where in the presence of Lenin and Stalin they enthusiastically listen to Gleb Krzhizhanovsky's historic report on the GOELRO plan.

Awards
For his trilogy Alexey Tolstoy was awarded the Stalin Prize of the first degree in the amount of 100,000 rubles on March 19, 1943, which he transferred to the Defense Fund for the construction of the tank "Grozny" (T-34 No. 310-0929).

Adaptations
 The Road to Calvary — Soviet three-part feature film (1957-1959)
 The Road to Calvary — Soviet 13-episode miniseries (1977)
 The Road to Calvary — Russian 12-episode miniseries (2017)

References

Further reading
 

Novels by Alexei Tolstoy
Epic novels
Russian historical novels
Novels set in 20th-century Russia
Russian novels adapted into television shows
Russian novels adapted into films
1920 novels
1928 Russian novels
1941 novels
Socrealist novels
Novels set in the Russian Revolution
Novels set during the Russian Civil War
Literary trilogies